Islam is a minority religion in Palau.

Demographics
As of 2018, there are 500 Muslims in Palau. Most of them are workers from Bangladesh who came to the country for job opportunities.

Mosques
The country currently has two mosques.

Organizations
 Palau Muslim Association

See also
 Religion in Palau

References

Palau
Palau
Religion in Palau